Hasan Raheem (born August 2, 1998) is a Pakistani singer, songwriter and rapper. He is known for his subtle, laid-back R&B, hip hop and indie pop styles of music.

Early life and education
Raheem was born in 1998. He belongs to a Shina family hailing from Gilgit, located in northern Pakistan's Gilgit-Baltistan region. He is the eldest of four siblings, born to a father who served in the Pakistan Army and a mother who is a housewife. Raheem describes himself as a "rebel" child while growing up, who had a taste for music. His first ever on-stage performance was in his fifth grade of school, when he performed a popular dance track by British-Indian musical group RDB.

Raheem moved to Karachi in order to pursue a career in medicine, graduating from the Bahria University Medical and Dental College.

Career
Raheem started writing, recording and releasing singles in 2018 while still in medical school. He began weaving melodies and lyrics together using his semi-acoustic guitar. His tracks such as "Aisay Kaisay", "Joona", "Aarzu", "Sar Phira" and "Sun Le Na" garnered millions of hits on YouTube and he quickly began to be noticed in the Pakistani music scene. In his early days, he collaborated with the Young Stunners.

In 2020, he won the Breakthrough Artist of the Year award for music at the 1st Pakistan International Screen Awards in Dubai.

He made his Coke Studio debut in season 14 in 2022, where he featured in a dance track titled "Peechay Hutt" in collaboration with Talal Qureshi and the Justin Bibis.

Artistry
Raheem's music is mainly R&B, hip hop and indie pop, with influences of soul. He has a free-flowing experimental approach to music with a "soft, mumbling rap-verse style" voice, and his lyrical style has been characterised for its simplicity; according to Raheem, he likes to pour his feelings into his music and prefers to "keep it as simple as possible so that anyone who listens to my songs can connect with them". He is also known for infusing "Gilgiti-inspired dance moves" in his music videos and occasionally incorporates lyrics in his native language, Shina, into his songs.

Discography

Studio albums

EPs

Singles and collaborations

In popular culture
His song "Peechay Hutt" with Justin Bibis and Talal Qureshi from Coke Studio (Season 14) was featured in the end credits of Marvel Studio’s television series, Ms. Marvel, in episode 2 - "Crushed".

References

1992 births
Living people
Bahria University alumni
Pakistani pop singers
Pakistani rappers
Pakistani rhythm and blues singers
Pakistani male singer-songwriters
People from Gilgit
Shina people